"Mama (Ana Ahabak)" is a song by Austrian recording artist Christina Stürmer. Dealing with the 2003 invasion of Iraq, it was written by Robert Pfluger and Alexander Kahr for her debut studio album Freier Fall (2003), while production was helmed by the latter. Selected as the album's third and final single, the song became Stürmer's second number one hit in Austria, where it was certified platinum by the International Federation of the Phonographic Industry (IFPI).

In 2005, a re-arranged version of "Mama (Ana Ahabak)" featuring additional production by Thorsten Brötzmann, was included on Stürmer's international album Schwarz Weiss, her first venture into the German and Swiss music markets. Selected as the album's third single, it reached number 11 in Germany and number 33 on the Swiss Singles Chart.

Music video 
The music video starts with Stürmer sitting on the floor. Scenes of little kids sitting outside in the cold around a fire are shown. Kids sitting alone in their beds are shown. The video then moves to show kids picking up scrap pieces of wood. Little kids are shown scavenging through garbage.

Interpretation 
The title "Mama (Ana Ahabak)" is a borrowing from the Arabic Ana Ahabak (in Arabic أنا أحبك transliterated anā uḥibbuk) which is Arabic for "I Love You." The song was written after the American and Allied attacks on Iraq and Afghanistan. The song is about the confusion of the war and the disastrous effect on children.

Charts

Weekly charts

Year-end charts

Certifications

References

External links
 

2003 singles
2005 singles
Christina Stürmer songs
Songs written by Alexander Kahr
2003 songs